"Miracle Drug" is a song by U2 from their album, How to Dismantle an Atomic Bomb.

Miracle drug may also refer to

"Miracle Drug," a song by A.C. Newman from his album The Slow Wonder
The previous band name for the American band Hot Chelle Rae

Drugs
Aspirin, used to reduce pain, fever, and/or inflammation, and as an antithrombotic
Penicillin, used for different bacterial infections
Trastuzumab, used to treat breast cancer and stomach cancer